Ivita is a Latvian feminine given name. The associated name day is December 28.

Notable people named Ivita
Ivita Krūmiņa (born 1981), Latvian ice hockey player

References 

Latvian feminine given names
Feminine given names